Dubinino is the name of several inhabited localities in Russia.

Urban localities
Dubinino, Sharypovo, Krasnoyarsk Krai, a work settlement under the administrative jurisdiction of the krai town of Sharypovo, Krasnoyarsk Krai

Rural localities
Dubinino, Republic of Bashkortostan, a selo in Inzersky Selsoviet of Beloretsky District of the Republic of Bashkortostan
Dubinino, Republic of Buryatia, a selo in Oymursky Selsoviet of Kabansky District of the Republic of Buryatia
Dubinino, Kaluga Oblast, a village in Dzerzhinsky District of Kaluga Oblast
Dubinino, Sharypovsky District, Krasnoyarsk Krai, a selo in Rodnikovsky Selsoviet of Sharypovsky District of Krasnoyarsk Krai
Dubinino, Leningrad Oblast, a logging depot settlement under the administrative jurisdiction of Kamennogorskoye Settlement Municipal Formation, Vyborgsky District, Leningrad Oblast
Dubinino, Lipetsk Oblast, a village in Vyazovsky Selsoviet of Lebedyansky District of Lipetsk Oblast
Dubinino, Chekhovsky District, Moscow Oblast, a village in Lyubuchanskoye Rural Settlement of Chekhovsky District of Moscow Oblast
Dubinino, Solnechnogorsky District, Moscow Oblast, a village under the administrative jurisdiction of the Town of Solnechnogorsk, Solnechnogorsky District, Moscow Oblast
Dubinino, Loknyansky District, Pskov Oblast, a village in Loknyansky District, Pskov Oblast
Dubinino, Nevelsky District, Pskov Oblast, a village in Nevelsky District, Pskov Oblast
Dubinino, Akatovskoye Rural Settlement, Gagarinsky District, Smolensk Oblast, a village in Akatovskoye Rural Settlement of Gagarinsky District of Smolensk Oblast
Dubinino, Yelninskoye Rural Settlement, Gagarinsky District, Smolensk Oblast, a village in Yelninskoye Rural Settlement of Gagarinsky District of Smolensk Oblast
Dubinino, Tver Oblast, a village in Toropetsky District of Tver Oblast
Dubinino, Vologda Oblast, a village in Saninsky Selsoviet of Babayevsky District of Vologda Oblast